A draft is the use of suction to move a liquid such as water from a vessel or body of water below the intake of a suction pump. A rural fire department or farmer might draft water from a pond as the first step in moving the water elsewhere. A suction pump creates a partial vacuum (a "draft") and the atmospheric pressure on the water's surface forces the water into the pump, usually via a rigid pipe (sometimes called a dry hydrant) or a semi-rigid hard suction hose.

Depending on application, fire department pumps lift water .

To reduce drafting friction and obtain a larger flow or higher lift, a larger cross-section of suction hose is employed. For example, using a five-inch (127 mm) hose, a pump that could lift 500 US gallons per minute (30 L/s) up  would only be able to lift the same amount of water  through a  hose. Fire engines are often seen carrying two or three   lengths of suction hose, but the longer the lift, the lower the flow, for a fixed-diameter suction hose and a given pump.

It is also possible to use a gravity siphon to draft water for a small lift, and this technique is often used in forest fire suppression, where portable reservoirs of 1,000 to 3,000 US gallons (5 to 10 m³) are filled with water and small hoses are used downhill of the tanks. The nozzle pressure is proportional to its distance below the reservoir surface. 100 ft height change yields approximately 43 psi. The tank may itself be gravity-fed through hoses from a nearby water source, or by pumps or helicopters delivering water from further away.

See also
Portable water tank

References

Firefighting